Wilson Immel Flattery (February 4, 1904 – April 5, 1957) was an American football player. He played college football at the College of Wooster before playing professionally in the National Football League (NFL) with the Canton Bulldogs during the 1925 and 1926 seasons.

References

External links
 

1904 births
1957 deaths
American football ends
American football guards
Canton Bulldogs players
Wooster Fighting Scots football players
People from Wooster, Ohio
Players of American football from Ohio